The decentralized administrations (apokentroménes dioikíseis) are the third level of administrative divisions in Greece. They were created in January 2011 as part of a far-reaching reform of the country's administrative structure, the Kallikratis reform (Law 3852/2010).

They enjoy both administrative and financial autonomy and exercise devolved state powers in urban planning, environmental and energy policy, forestry, migration and citizenship. Beyond that, they are tasked with supervising the first and second-level self-governing bodies: the regions and municipalities.

They are run by a government-appointed general secretary, assisted by an advisory council drawn from the regional governors and the representatives of the municipalities.

List of decentralized administrations 

 Decentralized Administration of Attica, with the capital of Athens
 Decentralized Administration of Macedonia and Thrace, with the capital of Thessaloniki
 Decentralized Administration of Epirus and Western Macedonia, with the capital of Ioannina
 Decentralized Administration of Thessaly and Central Greece, with the capital of Larissa
 Decentralized Administration of Peloponnese, Western Greece and the Ionian, with the capital of Patras
 Decentralized Administration of the Aegean, with the capital of Piraeus
 Decentralized Administration of Crete, with the capital of Heraklion

 Monastic community of Mount Athos, (excluded from the Kallikratis Plan)

References

Sources
 

Subdivisions of Greece